Vashi is a railway station on the Harbour Line of the Mumbai Suburban Railway network. Vashi railway station is the terminal point for CST and Thane Trains. Around 75,000 people travel from Vashi to Mumbai CST, and around 32 thousand people travel towards Panvel every day. 

Vashi railway station was built into and under the International Infotech Park, to ISO 9002 quality standards.

References 

Railway stations in Thane district
Mumbai Suburban Railway stations
Mumbai CR railway division